Donald Steven Conley (born January 18, 1972) is a former American football linebacker in the National Football League. Conley played for the Pittsburgh Steelers and the Indianapolis Colts in his three-year NFL career. He also played in the Canadian Football League and the XFL. He attended the University of Arkansas, where he was named 1st team All-SEC as a senior in 1995.

Conley is the younger brother of Olympic medalist Mike Conley, Sr., and the uncle of former Ohio State basketball player, and current Utah Jazz Point Guard, Mike Conley, Jr.

Conley has appeared on the TLC TV series 19 Kids and Counting and Counting On as a friend of the Duggar family.

References

External links
Just Sports Stats

1972 births
Living people
Sportspeople from Chicago
American football linebackers
Canadian football linebackers
Arkansas Razorbacks football players
Pittsburgh Steelers players
Indianapolis Colts players
Saskatchewan Roughriders players
Chicago Enforcers players
Arkansas Razorbacks men's track and field athletes
Players of American football from Chicago
Players of Canadian football from Chicago